Buch is a municipality in the district of Landshut in Bavaria in Germany.

The name "Buch am Erlbach" means "beech at alder brook".

References

Landshut (district)